The Libungan River is a river on Mindanao island in the Philippines. It springs on the slopes of Mount Piapayungan and flows south through the town of Alamada, Cotabato. At the town of Libungan, Cotabato, the river turns south-west and forms the boundary between the provinces of Cotabato and Maguindanao until it drains into the Rio Grande de Mindanao at the Libungan Marsh.

Tributaries include the Alamada River.

The name comes from the term Limbungan, meaning "cheater", which referred to the frequent changes in the river's course that would damage the crops and thereby cheat the farmers out of their harvest.

References

Rivers of the Philippines